Lidia Valenta (Russian: Лидия Валента, born Lidia Valentinovna Nebaba (Лидия Валентиновна Небаба),  March 29, 1982) is a German singer, songwriter and musician of Russian ancestry, who performs primarily in Germany and Russia. Her style incorporates elements of pop, jazz, folk, art song, world, and ballads.

Early life
Lidia was born in Brest, Soviet Union, and grew up in Czechoslovakia and Russia. Since 1998 she has lived in Germany and calls Dresden her home.

At the age of six she began to study piano, vocals, and music theory. Soon after, she won the Young Composers Competition in Prague. At the age of eight, she began to sing in choirs in Prague and later in Kaliningrad, which became her home in 1986. She studied humanities at Kaliningrad State University (renamed Immanuel Kant Baltic Federal University). Later studied applied linguistics on the Faculty of Philosophy at the Technical University of Dresden. She also studied vocals at the Lidia Nebaba Theater of Romance Music in Moscow.

Singing career
Valenta has performed at major music venues in Russia and Europe, including the Buryat State Opera and Ballet Theater in Ulan-Ude, Central House of Art Professionals in Moscow, Jupiter Concert Hall in Nizhny Novgorod, Nizhny Novgorod Kremlin, Russian House of Science and Culture in Berlin and the Russian Centre of Culture and Science in Rome.

Valenta writes most of her own songs, but she also draws inspiration from Russian, German, British, and American poetry. She performs and works with different international singers, musicians and poets such as Lidia Nebaba, Biser Kirov, Tino Eisbrenner, Rüdiger Krause, Vladimir Isaichev

In 2015, she formed the Lidia Valenta Band with jazz-pianist and Hammond organist Jo Aldinger, drummer Tim Hahn and double bass player Clemens Voyé.

Tours 

 2015 – "Love"
2016 – "Change of Scene"
 2017 – "Echo"
 2018 – "Night Train"
 2019 – "Weihnachten"
 2020 – "Oblaka"

Discography

Singles 

 Nochnoj Poezd (2010)
 Follow me (2011)
 Not Enough (2013)
 Flowless (2013)
 I Can't Resist (2014)
 I Miss You (2015)
 To The Disco (2015)

Song cycles 

 Night Train (2013): Six Russian Art Songs -songs on poems by  Vladimir Isaichev
 Echo (2015): Five Poetic Jazz Songs – songs on Poems by Emily Dickinson and Christina Rossetti

Music albums 

 Weihnachten (2019)
 Oblaka (2020)
 Love (2021)

Other activities 
Valenta is also an environmental activist. In September 2012, she was a member of an expedition that flew across Lake Baikal in a hot air balloon to draw attention to environmental issues related to preserving Baikal's ecosystem.

Since 2019 she is an active member of German-Russian Institute of Culture in Dresden.

Art and design

In 2014, Valenta began her work as a visual artist and designer, working primarily with porcelain. She collaborated with Dresden Porcelain, one of Germany's oldest porcelain factories, and with Holger John, a German artist whose Dresden art gallery has exhibited her work. The porcelain pieces are handmade and hand-painted.

In April 2016, Valenta combined two art genres, modern art on porcelain and music. Her art song exhibition called "Porcelain Pop" was shown in the historic Barock Gewandhaus in Dresden.

Valenta showed pieces of the collection at the first international porcelain biennale in the Albrechtsburg Castle in Meissen, the birthplace of European porcelain.

References

External links 
 

Living people
German women singer-songwriters
German women pop singers
World music singers
1982 births
German people of Russian descent
21st-century German women singers
Immanuel Kant Baltic Federal University alumni